The V Corps of the Ottoman Empire (Turkish: 5 nci Kolordu or Beşinci Kolordu) was one of the corps of the Ottoman Army. It was formed in the early 20th century during Ottoman military reforms.

Formation

Order of Battle, 1911 
With further reorganizations of the Ottoman Army, to include the creation of corps level headquarters, by 1911 the V Corps was headquartered in Salonika. The Corps before the First Balkan War in 1911 was structured as such:

V Corps, Salonika
13th Infantry Division, Salonika
37th Infantry Regiment, Salonika
38th Infantry Regiment, Salonika
39th Infantry Regiment, Salonika
13th Rifle Battalion, Salonika
13th Field Artillery Regiment, Salonika
13th Division Band, Salonika
14th Infantry Division, Serez
40th Infantry Regiment, Serez
41st Infantry Regiment, Nevrekop
42nd Infantry Regiment, Cuma-i Bala
14th Rifle Battalion, Yemen
14th Field Artillery Regiment, Serez
14th Division Band, Serez
15th Infantry Division, Usturmaca
43rd Infantry Regiment, Usturmaca
44th Infantry Regiment, Petriç
45th Infantry Regiment, Petriç
15th Rifle Battalion, Gevgili
15th Field Artillery Regiment, Salonika
15th Division Band, Usturmaca
Units of V Corps
5th Rifle Regiment, Salonika
6th Cavalry Brigade, Gevgili
14th Cavalry Regiment, Gevgili
25th Cavalry Regiment, Serez
26th Cavalry Regiment, Salonika
5th Mountain Artillery Battalion, Katerin
6th Mountain Artillery Battalion, Katerin
4th Field Howitzer Battalion, Demir Hisar
5th Engineer Battalion, Gevgili
5th Transport Battalion, Salonika
Salonika Port Command, Salonika
Heavy Artillery Battalion, Salonika
Torpedo Detachment, Salonika
Searchlight Detachment, Salonika
Border Detachment

Balkan Wars

Order of Battle, October 19, 1912 
On October 19, 1912, the corps was structured as follows:

V Corps (Serbian Front, under the command of the Vardar Army of the Western Army)
13th Division, 15th Division, 16th Division
Iştip Redif Division

Order of Battle, November 12, 1912 
On November 12, 1912, the corps was structured as follows:

V Corps (under the command of the Northern Group of the Vardar Army)
13th Division, 15th Division
5th Rifle Regiment, 26th Cavalry Regiment, 19th Artillery Regiment

Order of Battle, November 16, 1912 
On November 16, 1912, the corps was structured as follows:

V Corps (under the command of Right Flank Defensive Corps of the Vardar Army)
13th Division, 15th Division, 18th Division

World War I

Order of Battle, August 1914 
In August 1914, the corps was structured as follows:

V Corps (Anatolia)
13th Division, 14th Division, 15th Division

Order of Battle, November 1914, Late April 1915 
In November 1914, Late April 1915, the corps was structured as follows:

V Corps (Thrace)
13th Division, 14th Division, 15th Division

Order of Battle, Late Summer 1915, January 1916 
In late Summer 1915, January 1916, the corps was structured as follows:

V Corps (Gallipoli)
13th Division, 14th Division, 15th Division

Order of Battle, August 1916 
In August 1916, the corps was structured as follows:

V Corps (Caucasus)
9th Division, 10th Division, 13th Division

Order of Battle, December 1916, August 1917 
In December 1916, August 1917, the corps was structured as follows:

V Corps (Caucasus)
Coastal Detachments

Sources

Corps of the Ottoman Empire
Military units and formations of the Ottoman Empire in the Balkan Wars
Military units and formations of the Ottoman Empire in World War I
Salonica vilayet
History of Thessaloniki
1911 establishments in the Ottoman Empire